Assfactor 4 was a hardcore punk band from Columbia, South Carolina, formed by two members of Tonka (Jay and Alex) and two members of Unherd (Eric and Kevin). They formed in the fall of 1992 and broke up in late 1997.  Assfactor 4's sonic approach drew heavily from San Diego's early-1990s group Heroin, but their song structure was notably more akin to 1980's thrash and hardcore, placing Assfactor 4 in a unique position within the DIY hardcore scene of the era. Their contemporaries in the southeast U.S. included Columbia's In/Humanity and Premonition, Raleigh's Rights Reserved; and Richmond's Action Patrol. HeartattaCkzine readers voted Assfactor 4 "Coolest Band to Hang Out With" in 1995. Assorted Porkchops has planned on releasing a discography in the near future.

Discography
s/t demo tape (1993)
split 7-inch w/ Rights Reserved (1993)
Sometimes I Suck 7-inch (Repercussion Records/ Auricle Records, 1993)
Smoked Out 7-inch (Old Glory Records, 1994)
s/t LP (Old Glory Records, 1995)
Sports LP (Old Glory Records, 2000)

 Compilation appearances
"12 Years Of Living Hell" – "No Idea No. 11" comp CD/LP/zine (No Idea Records, 1994)
"Close Captioning For The Blind" – "All the President's Men" comp LP (Old Glory, 1995)
"Boy Cult Seavers" – "Yo Hablo" comp 7-inch (Lengua Armada Records, 1995)
"Nemo" – "We've Lost Beauty" comp LP (File Thirteen Records, 1996)
"Bonkee #3" and "Cleenkee/hairheart?" – "Nothing's Quiet On the Eastern Front" comp LP/CD (Reservoir Records, 1996)

American emo musical groups
American screamo musical groups
Musical groups from South Carolina
Musical groups established in 1992
Musical groups disestablished in 1997